Cedar Lawn Memorial Park (also known as Cedar Lawn Cemetery) is a cemetery and funeral home in Fremont, California, owned by Service Corporation International. The Lima Family Milpitas-Fremont Mortuary operates at the location. Interments number over 6,000.


Notable interments
 John "Red" Marion (1914–1975), Major League Baseball player
 John Davis Tuggle (1961–1986), National Football League player

See also

 List of cemeteries in California

References

External links
 
 
 

Geography of Fremont, California
Cemeteries in Alameda County, California